Matthew Rapf (October 22, 1920 – December 11, 1991) was an American film and television producer and screenwriter. He was best known for producing The Loretta Young Show, Ben Casey, and Kojak.

Biography
Matthew Rapf was born in New York City on October 22, 1920, the son of MGM film producer Harry Rapf. His brother Maurice was a screenwriter (blacklisted in the 1940s) and film professor.

After graduating from Dartmouth College in 1942, he served as a lieutenant (junior grade) in the U.S. Navy during World War II. Returning to civilian life, he followed in his father's and brother's footsteps into filmmaking and was hired by MGM to be part of a production group headed by Charles Schnee. His first credit was for writing and producing the 1948 Western Adventures of Gallant Bess. In 1952 he wrote and produced the noir film The Sellout. After this he worked primarily as a producer, on films such as Big Leaguer and Half a Hero.

Rapf next moved into television, signing a long-term contract with NBC in 1955, and producing series for them such as The Great Gildersleeve, Frontier, Jefferson Drum, and Ben Casey.

In 1973 he produced the TV film The Marcus-Nelson Murders, starring Telly Savalas as police lieutenant Theo Kojak. Though not originally intended as a pilot, it became the basis of one of Rapf's most successful series, Kojak. He would be nominated for three Emmy Awards for his work on the film and show.

He was married to prominent real estate agent Carol Rapf.

Matthew Rapf died in Malibu on December 11, 1991, after a bout of influenza.

Filmography

Film

References

External links
 

1920 births
1991 deaths
20th-century American male writers
20th-century American naval officers
American male screenwriters
United States Navy personnel of World War II
Dartmouth College alumni
Deaths from influenza
Film producers from New York (state)
Screenwriters from New York (state)
Television producers from New York City
Writers from New York City
20th-century American screenwriters